The blue rock thrush (Monticola solitarius) is a species of chat. This thrush-like Old World flycatcher was formerly placed in the family Turdidae. It breeds in southern Europe, northwest Africa, and from Central Asia to northern China and Malaysia. The blue rock thrush is the official national bird of Malta (the word for it in Maltese being Merill) and was shown on the Lm 1 coins that were part of the country's former currency.

Taxonomy
The blue rock thrush was described by Carl Linnaeus in 1758 in the 10th edition of his Systema Naturae under the binomial name Turdus solitarius. The scientific name is from Latin. Monticola is from  mons, montis "mountain", and colere, "to dwell", and the specific epithet solitarius means "solitary".

The rock thrush genus Monticola was formerly placed in the family Turdidae but molecular phylogenetic studies have shown that the species in the genus are more closely related to members of the Old World flycatcher family Muscicapidae.

There are five recognised subspecies:

 M. s. solitarius (Linnaeus, 1758) – northwest Africa, south Europe, north Turkey to Georgia and Azerbaijan.
 M. s. longirostris (Blyth, 1847) – Greece and west and south Turkey through the Middle East to the northwest Himalayas to northeast Africa and India
 M. s. pandoo (Sykes, 1832) – central Himalayas to east China and north Vietnam to Greater Sunda Islands
 M. s. philippensis (Statius Müller, 1776) – east Mongolia to Sakhalin south to Japan, extreme north Philippines and northeast China to Indonesia
 M. s. madoci Chasen, 1940 – Malay Peninsula and north Sumatra

There is a proposal to split Monticola solitarius into two species: a western taxon comprising M. s. solitarius and M. s. longirostris and an eastern taxon with M. s. philippensis, M. s. pandoo and M. s. madoci.

Description
The blue rock thrush is a starling-sized bird,  in length with a long slim bill. The breeding male of the nominate subspecies is unmistakable, with all blue-grey plumage apart from its darker wings. Females and immatures are much less striking, with dark brown upperparts, and paler brown scaly underparts. The male of the subspecies M. s. philippensis has rufous-chestnut plumage from the mid-breast down to the undertail. Both sexes lack the reddish outer tail feathers of rock thrush.

The male blue rock thrush sings a clear, melodious call that is similar to, but louder than the call of the rock thrush.

Distribution and habitat

The European, north African and southeast Asian birds are mainly resident, apart from altitudinal movements. Other Asian populations are more migratory, wintering in sub-Saharan Africa, India and southeast Asia. This bird is a very uncommon visitor to northern and western Europe.

Behaviour
Blue rock thrush breeds in open mountainous areas. It nests in rock cavities and walls, and usually lays 3-5 eggs. An omnivore, the blue rock thrush eats a wide variety of insects and small reptiles in addition to berries and seeds.

Gallery

References

External links 

 Blue rock thrush videos, photos & sounds on the Internet Bird Collection
 Ageing and sexing by Javier Blasco-Zumeta & Gerd-Michael Heinze
 Xeno-canto: audio recordings of the blue rock thrush

blue rock thrush
Chats (birds)
Birds of Eurasia
National symbols of Malta
Birds described in 1758
Taxa named by Carl Linnaeus